The Yasar Dogu Tournament 1988, was a wrestling event held in Istanbul, Turkey between 5 and 6 March 1988. This tournament was held as 16th.

This international tournament includes competition includes competition in men's  freestyle wrestling. This ranking tournament was held in honor of the two time Olympic Champion, Yaşar Doğu.

Medal table

Medal overview

Men's freestyle

Participating nations

References 

Yasar Dogu 1988
1988 in sport wrestling
Sports competitions in Istanbul
Yaşar Doğu Tournament
International wrestling competitions hosted by Turkey